The Red Baron was a custom t-bucket hot rod built in 1969.

The project was designed by Tom Daniel and built by Chuck Miller at Styline Customs.

The car was inspired by a Monogram model kit that Daniel had designed which was on display at the 1967 Chicago Toy Fair. Seeing the popularity of the kit, Monogram arranged to have a full-size version built. It is currently at the Smith Collection Museum of American Speed in Lincoln, Nebraska.

It later inspired a Hot Wheels car.

Notes

Hot Wheels
1960s cars
Kustom Kulture
Individual cars
Automotive styling features
Visual arts media
One-off cars